Ming Yang Wind Power Group Limited ("Ming Yang") is the largest private wind turbine manufacturer in China and the fifth largest overall in the country. The company was listed on the New York Stock Exchange from 1 October 2010 to June 22, 2016. It is developing the world's largest wind turbine with a capacity of 18 MW.

The company focuses on designing, manufacturing, selling and servicing megawatt-class wind turbines. Ming Yang cooperates with aerodyn Energiesysteme GmbH, a wind turbine and rotor blade engineering company based in Germany.  Ming Yang's key customers include the five largest state-owned power producers in China, with an aggregate installed capacity accounting for more than 5.5% of China's newly installed capacity in 2010.

The company started wind turbine production in 2007, with a prototype of 1.5 MW designed by aerodyn.

In 2010, Ming Yang started SCD production (2.75MW and 3.0MW). The SCD (Super Compact Drive) is an innovative two blade turbine by aerodyn (Husum WindEnergy AWARD 2009). In 2013, the new offshore SCD 6.5 wind turbine was presented. A two bladed downwind offshore turbine with helicopter deck. The first was connected to the grid in 2015.
Larger models are expected, and 12 MW is under development.

In 2011, Ming Yang ranked among the top 4 wind turbine suppliers in China and top 10 worldwide.

Mingyang won a bid for 87 MW (29 * 3 MW) two-bladed offshore wind turbines near Zhuhai in 2013.

In 2022, MingYang received orders for 1 GW of three-bladed 11 MW hybrid-drive wind turbines for Chinese offshore by 2023.

Products

In August 2021, Mingyang announced the MySE 16.0-242 offshore wind turbine. At that time, it was the largest offshore wind turbine under development, surpassing the previous largest Haliade-X design by GE Wind Energy.

As of 2022, the company produces the world's largest wind turbine, which is 794 ft (242 meters) tall and has a capacity of 16 MW.

In January 2023, Mingyang announced the MySE 18.X-28X with a 140-meter-long blade diameter and a total capacity of 18 MW.

References

External links

  
  

Companies listed on the New York Stock Exchange
Chinese brands
Wind power in China
Wind turbine manufacturers
Engineering companies of China
Companies based in Zhongshan
Publicly traded companies of China